Katsaros is a settlement in the municipal unit of Iardanos, Elis, Greece. It is situated at the foot of low hills, at 80 m elevation. In 2011 its population was 310. It is 2 km southeast of Vounargo, 2 km southwest of Fonaitika and 6 km northwest of Pyrgos

Population

See also

List of settlements in Elis

References

External links
Katsaros at the GTP Travel Pages

Iardanos
Populated places in Elis